Tavilehgah-e Sofla (also Romanized as Ţavīlehgāh-e Soflá; also known as Ţavīleh-ye Gāv and Ţavīleh-ye Soflá) is a village in Jalalvand Rural District, Firuzabad District, Kermanshah County, Kermanshah Province, Iran. At the 2006 census, its population was 25, in 7 families.

References 

Populated places in Kermanshah County